Hoppkorv was the seventh album by the American blues rock band Hot Tuna, and their last studio album recorded for Grunt Records.  Unlike previous albums, Hot Tuna relied entirely on an outside producer for this effort, Harry Maslin.  In addition to four new original songs by Jorma Kaukonen and one by Nick Buck, the album includes covers of Buddy Holly's "It's So Easy", Muddy Waters' "I Can't Be Satisfied", and Chuck Berry's "Talkin' 'bout You."  

The album reached number 116 on the Billboard charts. In 1996, RCA released the CD box set Hot Tuna in a Can which included a remastered version of this album, along with remasters of the albums Hot Tuna, First Pull Up, Then Pull Down, Burgers and America's Choice

Hoppkorv is Swedish for "Jumping Hot Dog" or "Jumping Sausage" in Google Translate...  Using Google Translate, in Norwegian, Hoppkorv means the children's game "Hopscotch"..

Track listing

Personnel
Jorma Kaukonen – vocals, guitar
Jack Casady – bass
Bob Steeler – drums, percussion

Additional Personnel
Nick Buck – keyboards
John Sherman – 2nd guitar on "Bowlegged Woman, Knock-Kneed Man"
Karen Tobin – background vocals

Production
Harry Maslin – producer, engineer
Pat Ieraci (Maurice) – production coordinator
Bill Thompson – manager
Allen Sudduth – assistant engineer
David Gertz – assistant mixing engineer
Michael Casady, Ron Dudley – equipment
Acy Lehman – art direction
Gribbitt (Tim Bryant) – album design
Chris Whorf – album design
Roger Rossmeyer – cover photos, liner photos
Jerry Leiberwitz (Leibowitz) – sleeve painting
Recorded and Mixed at Wally Heider Studios, San Francisco
Mastered by Rick Collins, Kendun Recorders, Burbank

References

Hot Tuna albums
1976 albums
Albums recorded at Wally Heider Studios
Grunt Records albums